The Mardy is a village in Monmouthshire, south east Wales.

Location
Mardy is located immediately to the north of the market town of Abergavenny. On old maps, the Mardy has the Welsh spelling Maerdy.

History and amenities
The Mardy has a close community and a varied mix of housing types and ages ranging from old farms recently built executive style homes. There is church one mile further north at Llantilio Pertholey. When the old Llantilio Pertholey Junior and infants mixed school was closed a new one was opened adjacent to the Mardy World War II camp but retained the name Llantilio Pertholey School.

Governance
Mardy is also an electoral ward, formed from part of the Llantilio Pertholey community. It elects one county councillor to Monmouthshire County Council.

References

External links 
 Mardy AFC - the local football team
 

Villages in Monmouthshire
Monmouthshire electoral wards